The Gimnasio Olímpico Juan de la Barrera is an indoor arena located in Mexico City, Mexico. At the 1968 Summer Olympics, it hosted the volleyball competitions, and it is located next to the Olympic pool. It was the home of La Ola Roja del Distrito Federal of the LNBP from 2000 to 2007 and the professional basketball team Capitanes de Ciudad de México from 2017 to 2020. The arena seats 5,242 people in two stand levels. For years, it has been the traditional home of professional basketball in Mexico City.

References

1968 Summer Olympics official report. Volume 2. Part 1. pp. 72, 74.

Venues of the 1968 Summer Olympics
Olympic volleyball venues
Olímpico Juan de la Barrera
Sports venues in Mexico City
Volleyball venues in Mexico
Basketball venues in Mexico